The Van is a 1996 film, based on the novel The Van (the third in The Barrytown Trilogy) by Roddy Doyle. Like The Snapper (1993), it was directed by Stephen Frears. The first film of the trilogy, The Commitments (1991), was directed by Alan Parker. It was entered into the 1996 Cannes Film Festival. The film stars Colm Meaney and Donal O'Kelly.

Plot 
Brendan "Bimbo" Reeves gets laid off from his job as a baker in Barrytown, a working-class quarter of Dublin. With his redundancy cheque, he buys a van and sells fish and chips with his best mate, Larry. Due, in part, to Ireland's surprising success at the 1990 FIFA World Cup, their business starts off well.

However, the relationship between the two friends soon becomes strained as Bimbo and his wife, Maggie, behave more and more like typical bosses. Larry believes that Maggie is the cause of the strained friendship, as he thinks she is pushing Bimbo away from him.

Then the van is closed down because of poor hygiene by health inspector Des O'Callaghan. Bimbo thinks that Larry told the Health Board about the van, leading to a fight between the two. Larry quits the job, despite Bimbo's best efforts to get him back.

Bimbo then drives the van into the sea, so as to win his friendship with Larry back.

Cast

 Colm Meaney as Larry
 Donal O'Kelly as Brendan "Bimbo" Reeves
 Ger Ryan as Maggie
 Caroline Rothwell as Mary
 Neilí Conroy as Diane
 Rúaidhrí Conroy as Kevin
 Brendan O'Carroll as Weslie
 Stuart Dunne as Sam
 Laurie Morton as Maggie's Mum
 Marie Mullen as Vera
 Jon Kenny as Gerry McCarthy

Reception
Roger Ebert of the Chicago Sun-Times wrote: "When I saw The Van for the first time at the Cannes Film Festival in 1996, I felt it was the least of the three films, and I still do, but it was trimmed of about five minutes of footage after Cannes and, seeing it again a year later, I found it quicker and more alive. It is also the most thoughtful, in a way, and the ending has a poignancy and an unresolved quality that is just right: These disorganized lives would not fit into a neat ending".

Rotten Tomatoes gave the film a score of 38% based on reviews from 21 critics.

It opened in the UK on 29 November 1996 on 94 screens and finished in sixth place for the weekend with a gross of £204,447.

References

External links 
 
 
 
 
 

Films directed by Stephen Frears
1996 films
1996 comedy-drama films
Irish comedy-drama films
English-language Irish films
Films set in Dublin (city)
Films shot in Dublin (city)
Films set in 1990
Films based on Irish novels
Films scored by Eric Clapton
Fox Searchlight Pictures films
Beacon Pictures films
1990s English-language films